Elmo is a census-designated place and unincorporated community in Kaufman County, Texas, United States. The population was 768 at the 2010 Census.

History
Elmo's history begins in 1870 when the Texas and Pacific Railway laid track through the area. A community sprang up at the railhead, and it was decided that the new town be named to honor Elmo Scott, a T&P Railroad surveyor. Elmo received a post office in 1873 and by the mid-1880s possessed several mills, five churches, its own schools and approximately 900 residents. Through the remainder of the 19th century, however, the population fell and by 1945 only 150 people called Elmo home. By 1990 this figure had fallen to 90; it remained at this level through to the 2000 Census.

In 1892, Elmo residents adopted a resolution declaring a sundown town, prohibiting African Americans from living there and forcing existing black residents to leave.

Notable people
Henry Qualls (July 8, 1934 – December 7, 2003) was an American Texas and country blues guitarist and singer. He found success late in his life after being "discovered" in 1993 by the Dallas Blues Society. He released his only album in 1994 but toured globally playing at a number of festivals. Qualls was born in Elmo and lived all his life in the community.

References

External links
 ELMO, TX at Handbook of Texas Online

Unincorporated communities in Kaufman County, Texas
Unincorporated communities in Texas
Dallas–Fort Worth metroplex
Populated places established in 1870
Census-designated places in Kaufman County, Texas
Census-designated places in Texas
Sundown towns in Texas
1870 establishments in Texas